The 2000 Dutch TT was the eighth round of the 2000 Grand Prix motorcycle racing season. It took place on 24 June 2000 at the TT Circuit Assen located in Assen, Netherlands.

500 cc classification

250 cc classification

125 cc classification

Championship standings after the race (500cc)

Below are the standings for the top five riders and constructors after round eight has concluded. 

Riders' Championship standings

Constructors' Championship standings

 Note: Only the top five positions are included for both sets of standings.

References

Dutch TT
Dutch
Tourist Trophy